Buckland Hospital is a community hospital at Dover in Kent, England. It is managed by East Kent Hospitals University NHS Foundation Trust.

History
The hospital has its origins in the Dover Union Workhouse Infirmary which was completed in 1836. This was replaced by a new infirmary in 1884 and a nurses' home was added in 1902. It became the county hospital in 1943 and it joined the National Health Service as Buckland Hospital in 1948. Funding for a purpose-built modern hospital on an adjacent site was approved in December 2012. The new hospital, which incorporates a minor injury unit, was completed in June 2015.

The site of the old hospital was bought by a developer for £1.5 million in December 2016.

References

External links

Hospitals in Kent
NHS hospitals in England
Buildings and structures in Dover, Kent